Denmark is an unincorporated community in Perry County, Illinois, United States.

History
A post office was established at Denmark in 1865, and remained in operation until 1906. The first postmaster being a Danish immigrant most likely caused the name to be selected.

References

Unincorporated communities in Perry County, Illinois
Unincorporated communities in Illinois